The Southern Indiana Athletic Conference (SIAC) is a high school athletic conference based in Evansville, Indiana.  Five of the conferences 10 schools; Bosse, Central, Harrison, North, and Reitz; comprise the public Evansville Vanderburgh School Corporation.  Mater Dei and Memorial are private Catholic high schools ran by the Roman Catholic Diocese of Evansville, and the largest member is Castle, a public school located in neighboring Newburgh in Warrick County under the Warrick County School Corporation. The league was founded in 1936, and at one point stretched far across southern and western Indiana: from Mount Vernon in the west to New Albany in the east, and from Evansville in the south to Terre Haute in the north. Jasper and Vincennes Lincoln announced in May 2019 that they would leave the disbanding Big Eight Conference to rejoin the Southern Indiana Athletic Conference beginning with the 2020-21 season.

Member schools

 Due to making back-to-back state finals appearances, Evansville Reitz Memorial will compete in Class AAAA in football until 2021.

Former members

 Linton played concurrently in the SIAC and West Central Conference 1944-45, and the SIAC and WIC 1945-51.
 Sullivan played in both the SIAC and West Central Conference 1944-45, and the SIAC and WIC 1945-62.

Membership timeline

Conference championships

Football

Boys basketball

Boys cross country

Wrestling

Boys soccer

Boys tennis

Boys swimming

Baseball

Boys golf

Boys track and field

Volleyball

Girls basketball

Girls cross country

Girls soccer

Girls tennis

Girls swimming

Softball

Girls golf

Girls track and field

State titles

John H. Castle Knights
Football (1982, 1994)
Boys Soccer (2000)
Girls Basketball (2006)
Softball (2001)

Evansville Benjamin Bosse Bulldogs
 Boys Basketball (1943, 1944, 1962)

Evansville Central Bears
None

Evansville William Henry Harrison Warriors
 Girls Golf (1989)
 Boys Golf (2012)

Evansville Mater Dei Wildcats
 Baseball (1999)
 Boys Basketball (2004)
 Girls Basketball (2012, 2013)
 Football (2001, 2022)
 Wrestling (1986, 1995, 1996, 1997, 1998, 1999, 2000, 2001, 2002, 2003, 2006, 2007, 2021)
 Softball (2016)
 Girls Soccer (2017, 2018, 2019)

Evansville North Huskies
 Baseball (1962*)
 Boys Basketball (1967)
 Boys Golf (2000)
 Girls Golf (2014, 2015, 2016, 2018, 2020, 2021)

* = indicates title won before IHSAA State Tournament was initiated

Evansville Francis Joseph Reitz Panthers
 Girls Basketball (1981)
 Football (1933*, 1940*, 1948*, 1953*, 1956*, 1957*, 1960*, 1961*, 1971*, 2007, 2009)
 Bowling (2012+)

* = indicates title won before IHSAA State Tournament was initiated
+ = indicates title sanctioned by the Indiana High School Bowling Association

Evansville Reitz Memorial Tigers
 Baseball (1978, 1989, 1993)
 Football (1937*, 1958*, 2017, 2019)
 Girls Soccer (1989*, 1997, 2008, 2013, 2017, 2021, 2022)
 Softball (2002)
 Girls Tennis (1991, 1993, 1994, 1995, 1996, 2012)
 Boys Soccer (1979*, 1980*, 1981*, 1983*, 1984*, 1986*, 1988*, 1989*, 1990*, 1992*, 2007, 2008, 2016, 2017, 2019, 2020)
 Girls Basketball (2011)

* = indicates title won before IHSAA State Tournament was initiated

Neighboring conferences
 Big Eight Conference
 Pocket Athletic Conference

See also
 Sports in Evansville
 Hoosier Hysteria
 Largest high school gyms in the United States

References

 
Indiana high school athletic conferences
High school sports conferences and leagues in the United States
Evansville, Indiana